Zoetrope was an American heavy metal band from Chicago. Although their sound was akin to thrash metal, the group described themselves as "Street Metal".

History
The group was formed in 1976 by teenage friends Barry Stern (drums/vocals), Kevin Michael Rasofsky, aka Kevin Michael, (guitar), and Calvin "Willis" Humphrey (bass), soon to be joined by second guitarist Ken Black.  Initially playing covers, the band soon ventured into writing their own material and released a single in 1980. Although undeniably a metal band, Zoetrope was also active in Chicago's hardcore punk scene, sharing bills with locals hardcore bands and hanging out at O'Banions, a Chicago punk bar (Ken Black and Barry Stern also produced the self-titled LP by Chicago-based hardcore band Life Sentence in 1986). Following the release of a couple of demo tapes, the group was signed to Combat Records and issued their first LP, Amnesty, in 1985. In 1987, the band traveled to Los Angeles to record their follow up, A Life of Crime, with producer Randy Burns. During the recording sessions, Ken Black left the band and returned to Chicago to sort out substance abuse issues.  He was replaced by Louis Svitek. Although Svitek appears on the album's cover, Kevin Michael later confirmed that Ken Black had finished his guitar parts before leaving Los Angeles. During the tour supporting A Life of Crime, Svitek was recruited for M.O.D. by Billy Milano. After the tour, Barry Stern left to join fellow Chicagoans Trouble. Kevin Michael eventually returned with a new line up for 1993's Mind Over Splatter but the band folded for good soon after.

Louis Svitek later played with the Chicago punk band Lost Cause, Ministry, Mind Funk, Pigface, The Hollow steps (also featured Ken Black on a few cuts) and Project 44. He currently runs Wu Li Records, a hip-hop label based in Chicago.  Original member Barry Stern filled in on drums for a tour with Cathedral and made a guest appearance on the self-titled debut by Debris Inc., which featured former members of Saint Vitus and Trouble. Stern died on April 1, 2005, from complications after hip-replacement surgery. He was singing for the local band, D-Connect, at the time of his death. Trouble dedicated their 2007 album, Simple Mind Condition, to his memory.

Members
Kevin Michael – Guitar (1976–1993)
Ken Black – Guitar (1976–1987)
Barry Stern – Drums/Vocals (1976–1988)
Calvin "Willis" Humphrey – Bass (1976–1990)
Louis Svitek – Guitar (1987–1988)
Pete Montswillo – Vocals (1988–1993)
Michael Ray Garrett – Guitar (1988–1993)
Drew Kristoff – Drums/Vocals (1988–1990)
Sean Schipper – Drums (1990–1993)
Erik "Tater" Armstrong – Bass (1990–1993)

Discography
"The Right Way" b/w "Call 33" 7" (1980, self-released)
The Metal Log Vol. 1 demo tape (1983, self-released)
The Metal Log Vol. 2 demo tape (1985, self-released)
Amnesty LP (1985, Combat Records, reissued on CD with the Metal Log demos as bonus tracks by Century Media in Europe in 1999)
A Life of Crime LP (1987, Combat Records, reissued on CD with liner notes by Kevin Michael on Century Media in Europe in 1998)
Mind Over Splatter LP/CD (1993, Grind Core Records/Red Light)

References

External links
Zoetrope @ the Metal Archives
Zoetrope @ the Librarius Metallicus

Heavy metal musical groups from Illinois
Musical groups established in 1976
Musical groups disestablished in 1993
American thrash metal musical groups
Musical groups from Chicago